Zambo ( or ) or Sambu is a racial term historically used in the Spanish Empire to refer to people of mixed Indigenous and African ancestry. Occasionally in the 21st century, the term is used in the Americas to refer to persons who are of mixed African and Indigenous American ancestry.  Historically, the racial cross between enslaved Africans and Amerindians was referred to as a zambayga, then zambo, then sambo.

However, in Portugal and Portuguese-speaking Africa, cafuzo is used to refer to someone born of an African person and a person of mixed African and European ancestry.

Background
The meaning of the term sambo, however, is contested in North America, where other etymologies have been proposed. The word is believed to have originated from one of the Romance languages or Latin and its direct descendants.

In some parts of colonial Spanish America, the term  applied to the children of one African and one Amerindian parent, or the children of two zambo parents. This term of classification appears in official marriage registers and other official documentation.

During this period, many other terms denoted individuals of African-Amerindian ancestry in ratios smaller or greater than the 50:50 of zambos:  (zambo-Amerindian mixture) for example. Today in parts of Spanish America,  refers to all people with significant or visible amounts of both African and Amerindian ancestry.

History

The term zambo was not formally used in Spanish territories. Competing terms, such as mulato, were also used. From the beginning the early sixteenth century, when African slaves were first imported to Hispaniola, unions between them and indigenous peoples, and Spanish colonists, began to take place. The two non-European groups sometimes worked together in the mines or on the plantations of Hispaniola, and on other Spanish Caribbean islands following the introduction of sugar cane production in the 1520s. In other cases, Africans took refuge in indigenous communities after escaping slavery.

The term zambos was generally used to refer to persons who did not have European ancestry, but all sorts of unions took place through the centuries, of course. In the eighteenth century, the Spanish began making formal racial classifications, and defined zambo in what became its final, official meaning.

Some zambo groups became well known after being created by runaway or rebel Africans who mixed with or took over indigenous communities. In the unconquered regions of Esmeraldes, in what would become Ecuador, for example, a small group of shipwrecked former slaves gained control of some indigenous communities, eventually representing them before Spanish authorities in the late sixteenth and early seventeenth centuries.

The Misquito Zambos developed as the descendants of a group of African slaves who revolted in 1640 on a slave ship. They wrecked it at Cape Gracias a Dios on the border between Honduras and Nicaragua, to escape into the interior. There they united with the indigenous Miskito people. By the early eighteenth century, Afro-Miskito people came to dominate the kingdom. They led warriors on many extensive slave raids to capture slaves for sale to Europeans. Their alliance and protection of English-speaking merchants and settlers in the area helped Great Britain found the colony of British Honduras (present day Belize).

Today

Officially, zambos represent sizeable minorities in the northwestern South American countries Colombia, Brazil, Venezuela, Guyana, and Ecuador, as well as in the Central American country of Panama. A small but noticeable number of zambos, resulting from recent unions of Amerindian men to Afro-Ecuadorian women, and they are common in major coastal cities of Ecuador ans in Imbabura aprovince. Prior to rural-to-urban migration in Ecuador, Amerindians and Afro-Ecuadorians were ethnicities that were mostly confined to the Andes region and Esmeraldas Province and the Chota Valley in Imbabura Province, respectively.

In Central America, two indigenous-African mixed groups have developed: the Miskito and the Garifuna. The Garifuna originated from the combination of Africans who were shipwrecked or fled from neighboring islands to St. Vincent during the 17th and the 19l8th centuries. In 1797, they were deported by the British for supporting France during the French Revolutionary Wars to the island of Roatan, off the coast of Honduras. From there, they reached the mainland and developed communities along the coast of Central America from Nicaragua to Belize.

In Mexico, where zambos were sometimes known as lobos (literally meaning wolves), they form a sizelable minority. According to the 2015 Intercensus Estimate, 896,829 people identified as both Afro-Mexican and Indigenous Mexican. The vadt majority of the country's Afro-descended population has been absorbed into the wider mestizo population. Greater concentrations can be found only in communities scattered around the southern coastal states, including Michoacán, Guerrero, Oaxaca, Campeche, Quintana Roo, Yucatán, and Veracruz, where many of the country's Afro-Mexicans reside.

Culturally, Mexican lobos followed Amerindian traditions, rather than African influences, as they often had Amerindian mothers and were brought up in her culture. Such acculturation also took place in Bolivia, where the Afro-Bolivian community absorbed and retained many aspects of Amerindian cultural influences, such as dress and the use of the Aymara language. Those communities of Afro-Bolivians reside in the Yungas region of the Bolivian department of La Paz.

Racism and discrimination 
The populations of African and Amerindian ancestry have generally been marginalized and discriminated against.

In March 2008, the then US Senator Barack Obama reflected in a speech the difficult situation faced by the populations of African and Amerindian ancestors, thereby demonstrating his concern for the Zamba population of his country.

See also 

Afro-Latin Americans
Black Indians
Black Seminoles
Casta
Cholo
Garifuna people
Lobo (racial category)
Marabou
Mestee
Mestizo
Miskito
Miscegenation
Mulatto
List of topics related to the African diaspora

References

External links
Stranded in Paradise: Shipwrecked Hundreds of Years Ago, the Garifuna Are Still Trying to Find Their Way by Teresa Wiltz, The Washington Post.

African–Native American relations
Afro-Indigenous
Multiracial affairs in the Americas
Ethnic groups in the Americas
Latin American caste system
Ethnic groups in Latin America
Person of color